The English Schools Foundation (ESF) manages 22 schools in Hong Kong: five secondary schools, nine primary schools, two "all through" schools, five kindergartens and one school for children with special needs.

Kindergartens
Abacus International Kindergarten
Hillside International Kindergarten
Tsing Yi Kindergarten
Tung Chung Kindergarten
Wu Kai Sha Kindergarten

Primary schools
 Bauhinia School - closed in July 2007, taken over by Discovery College
 Beacon Hill School
 Bradbury School 
 Clearwater Bay School
 Glenealy School
 Kennedy School
 Kowloon Junior School
 Peak School
 Quarry Bay School
 Sha Tin Junior School

Secondary schools
Island School
King George V School
Sha Tin College
South Island School
West Island School

All through schools
Note: these schools are run as private independent schools with no subvention from the Hong Kong Government.

Discovery College
Renaissance College

Special needs schools
Jockey Club Sarah Roe School

References

External links
English Schools Foundation

English Schools Foundation
+
+